HMS Leda was an  of the British Royal Navy. She was built by Sheerness Dockyard from 1891–1893. She was converted to a minesweeper in 1908–1909 and continued these duties during the First World War. Leda was scrapped in 1922.

Design and construction
The Alarms were slightly modified  versions of the previous Sharpshooter-class, with modified engines to improve reliability.

Two triple-expansion steam engines, fed by four locomotive boilers, drove two propeller shafts.

The ship was armed with two 4.7 inch (120 mm) QF guns mounted fore and aft on the ships centreline, backed up by four 3-pounder (47 mm) guns (two in single mounts on the ship's beam and two in casemates forward) and a single Gardner machine gun. Five 14-inch torpedo tubes were fitted (one fixed in the ship's bow and two twin mounts), with three reload torpedoes carried. The ship had a crew of 91.

Leda was laid down at Sheerness Dockyard on 25 June 1891 and launched on 13 September 1892. She was completed in November 1893 at a cost of £62,145.

Service
After completion, Leda was assigned to the Medway Fleet Reserve, and was required to be ready to be commissioned on 24 hours notice. In August 1894 Leda took part in that year's Naval Manoeuvres. On 18 July 1895, Leda arrested the French fishing smack L'Espérance off Dungeness, with the French ship's captain fined £10 and L'Espérances catch confiscated. In July 1896 Leda again took part in that year's Naval Manoeuvres. On 26 June 1897 Leda was present at the Jubilee Fleet Review at Spithead.

On the night of 8 August 1899, Leda was on patrol off Dungeness to stop illegal fishing by French fishing vessels in British territorial waters when she encountered the French trawler L'Etoile de la Mer fishing within the three-mile limit. Leda signalled for the French trawler to stop, but instead, L'Etoile de la Mer made off under full sail, Leda fired warning shots with blank rounds, and when this failed to cause the trawler to stop, fired live rifle rounds with the intention of damaging the trawler's rigging. This gunfire killed one of L'Etoile de la Mers crew who was shot in the head. The trawler was then towed to Folkestone by one of Ledas boats. An inquest gave a verdict of Accidental death for the French sailor. L'Etoile de la Mers captain was fined for fishing illegally and resisting capture, and the trawler's fishing gear confiscated and destroyed.

Leda took part in the 1900 Naval Manoeuvres in July that year, and in the 1901 Manoeuvres, where she was judged by the umpires to have been captured by the opposing force.

Despite these improvements, she was still too slow for effective use against much faster torpedo boats and destroyers, and was employed as a drillship for Royal Navy Reserve training in the Clyde until 1906.

In 1907 Leda was assigned to coast-guard duties. On 8 February 1908, Leda collided with the old cruiser  in Harwich harbour. Leda was badly holed and had to be beached to avoid sinking. She went under repair at Sheerness Dockyard. Repairs were completed by the end of March that year, allowing Leda to resume her coast-guard duties at Harwich. On 16 September 1909, Leda was in collision with the fishing smack Mercia off the entrance to Lowestoft harbour. Mercias owners took the case of the collision to Admiralty court, hoping to recover the cost of damages to their vessel, but the judge ruled that the collision was solely the fault of a poor course set by the master of Mercia.

She was converted to a minesweeper in 1909, which involved removing the torpedo tubes, but continued on coast-guard and fishery protection operations. On 3 February 1914 Leda was towing the coastguard cutter Snipe off Gunfleet in the Thames estuary when Snipe foundered and sunk. One of Ledas crew drowned when Snipe sank.

On the outbreak of the First World War Leda, reverting to the role of minesweeper, joined the newly established Grand Fleet. In August 1914, the minesweepers attached to the Grand Fleet, including Leda were employed on carrying out daily sweeps of the Pentland Firth.

On 16 October 1914, Leda sighted a suspected periscope inside the fleet anchorage at Scapa Flow in the Orkneys. On 22 October 1914, as a result of this and other suspected sightings of submarines, the 1st and 4th Battle Squadrons of the Grand Fleet moved to Lough Swilly on the east coast of Northern Ireland, which was considered more secure against submarine attack. On 27 October, the battleship  struck a mine off Tory Island, north-west of Lough Swilly, and despite efforts to tow her to safety, sank later that day. Leda, which along with sister ship  was already at Lough Swilly, was used to clear a safe channel through the minefield.

Leda was a member of the Second Fleet Sweeping Flotilla, based at Scapa Flow as part of the Grand Fleet, in July 1917.

Leda was sold for scrap on 14 July 1920 to Cardiff Marine Stores. She was broken up in Germany in 1922.

Pennant numbers

Notes

References

Bibliography

 

Alarm-class torpedo gunboats
Ships built in Sheerness
1891 ships